Falsobiobessa fasciculosa is a species of beetle in the family Cerambycidae, and the only species in the genus Falsobiobessa. It was described by Breuning in 1942.

References

Crossotini
Beetles described in 1942
Monotypic Cerambycidae genera